Hallelujah, Baby! is a musical with music by Jule Styne, lyrics by Adolph Green and Betty Comden, and a book by Arthur Laurents.  The show is "a chronicle of the African American struggle for equality during the [first half of the] 20th century."

The musical premiered on Broadway in 1967 and made a young Leslie Uggams a star. It won the Tony Award for Best Musical.

Synopsis
Georgina is a talented, beautiful and ambitious African American woman, determined to have a career.  Overcoming many obstacles, she rises to stardom.  She makes her way through the Great Depression, World War II, and the beginning of the civil rights movement.  Her mother advises her to "keep her place" as a maid on a South Carolina estate, but Georgina negotiates the blocks to stardom from her negative and opportunistic mother.  She encounters the racism that pervades society and show business.

Two men vie for Georgina's attention. Harvey, who is white, is able to provide opportunities for her.  Her fiancé, Clem, who is a black train porter, cannot help her on her journey.  By the 1950s, she is a successful singer in an expensive night club.  However, Clem, who became an Army captain and then a civil rights activist, challenges Georgina's life goals.

Musical numbers

Act 1
Prologue - Georgina 
Back in the Kitchen - Momma 
My Own Morning - Georgina 
The Slice - Clem and Provers 
Farewell, Farewell - Calhoun, Betty Loo, Captain Yankee, Georgina, and Harvey 
Feet Do Yo' Stuff - Georgina, Chorines, Tip, and Tap 
Watch My Dust - Clem 
Smile, Smile - Clem, Georgina, and Momma 
Witches' Brew - Georgina, Mary, Ethel, and Company 
Breadline Dance - Bums 
Another Day - Harvey, Clem, Mary, and Georgina 
I Wanted to Change Him - Georgina 
Being Good Isn't Good Enough - Georgina 

Act 2 
Dance Drill - Tip, Tap and G.I.s 
Talking to Yourself - Georgina, Clem, and Harvey 
Limbo Dance - Night Club Patrons 
Hallelujah Baby! - Georgina, Tip, and Tap 
Not Mine - Harvey 
I Don't Know Where She Got It - Momma, Clem, and Harvey 
Now's the Time - Georgina 
Now's the Time (Reprise) - Company

"Witches Brew" had a tune that was recycled from "Call Me Savage," a song from a prior musical Fade Out – Fade In and was originally sung by Carol Burnett.

Productions  
The musical opened on Broadway at the Martin Beck Theatre on April 26, 1967, and closed on January 13, 1968, after 293 performances and 22 previews.  It was directed by Burt Shevelove,  choreographed by Kevin Carlisle, musical direction by Buster Davis, orchestrations by Peter Matz, with scenic design by William and Jean Eckart, costumes by Irene Sharaff and lighting by Tharon Musser. The cast featured Allen Case as Harvey, Robert Hooks as Clem, Leslie Uggams as Georgina, Barbara Sharma as Mary, Lillian Hayman as Momma, and Marilyn Cooper as Mrs. Charles, Mistress, Ethel, Dorothy.  The production won five Tony Awards (out of nine nominations), including Best Musical, and Uggams and Hayman won the Tonys for Best Actress and Best Featured Actress, respectively, for their performances. This remains the only show to win the Tony for Best Musical after it closed. 

In 2000, the York Theatre Company's "Musicals in Mufti" series revived the show as a concert that ran from October 27–29.

The George Street Playhouse in New Brunswick, New Jersey presented the musical in October - November 2004.  Additional lyrics were written by Amanda Green. The cast featured Suzzanne Douglas as Georgina and Ann Duquesnay as Momma.

The Arena Stage, Washington, DC production ran in January and February 2005.

Laurents' recollections
Arthur Laurents felt that "the original production was too soft in its take on black social progress during the first six decades or so of the twentieth century.  It was originally written with Lena Horne in mind. When the steely Horne opted out of the project, it was rewritten to suit the more youthful and bubbly Leslie Uggams."  In the 2004 production, Laurents attempted "to add levels of darker intensity....  However, the music and lyrics are in the infectiously bright and bubbly style of musical comedy, and his efforts in this area reduce the charm and good spirits of the show without adding much of significance in the way of depth or insight."  According to Laurents, after Lena Horne declined to do the show, "What we should have done is abandon the show.... Instead it was rewriten for a woman who is one of the nicest women I have ever met in the theatre, Leslie Uggams,--and, God knows, she has a beautiful voice ... she was good, but it wasn't that original show. The show lost its edge, and I must say I lost interest in it."

Awards and nominations

Original Broadway production

References

Information about the musical

External links

Hallelujah, Baby! at the IBDB database
Synopsis, song list and production at guidetomusicaltheatre.com
Hallelujah, Baby! at Stageagent.com

1967 musicals
Broadway musicals
Original musicals
Tony Award for Best Musical
Tony Award-winning musicals
Musicals by Jule Styne
Musicals by Betty Comden and Adolph Green
Plays set in the 1930s
Plays set in the 1940s
Plays set in the 1950s
Musicals by Arthur Laurents